Yainax Butte is a mountain located just south of the Klamath Reservation, in Oregon. Yainax is a Klamath language word meaning "little hill".

Notable residents include Toby Riddle, who lived at Yainax Butte in her later years.

Name history
The butte has been known by various names such as Modoc Mountain, Bald Mountain, and Yonna Butte. Because of common usage, the US Board on Geographic Names officially changed the name to Yainax Butte in 1927.

References 

Buttes of Oregon
Geography of Klamath County, Oregon
Landmarks in Oregon
Mountains of Oregon